Eudorah Moore (nee Morse; June 15, 1918 – April 20, 2013) was an American curator and patron of the arts. She is regarded as revolutionizing California design and for her advocacy of craft as an art form.

Believing that craft was as high a calling as more traditional forms of art, Moore sought to blur the distinction between the two. She promoted the New Craftsman Movement, which fostered the contributions of people working in the crafts, developed links between craftspeople and manufacturers, and railed against the dehumanizing effects of the industrial revolution which, in the context of made objects, she saw as destructive to individual effort and expression as it corporatized the creative act.

Early life 
Moore was born Eudorah Goodell Morse in Denver, Colorado to Bradish P. and Anna Earll Reynolds Morse. Her father ran the specialist mining and machinery concern Morse Brothers Machinery Company, and her mother was the daughter of Colorado mining pioneer Albert Eugene Reynolds. She graduated from Smith College in 1940.

She was the sister of businessman and philanthropist Albert Reynolds Morse.

Career
Moore’s first excursion into the design field (and her only effort at actually designing) was the creation of a sandal in the early 1940s that she sold to high-end stores in Los Angeles. In the early 1950s, Moore became the founding president of the Pasadena Art Alliance, which was organized to provide support to art institutions in Pasadena, particularly the Pasadena Art Museum.  By 1957 she was president of the board of the museum.  Continuing her long-standing interest in crafts, in 1961 she took over the Museum’s series of California Design exhibitions, changing them from small, annual shows of furniture into "a blockbuster juried triennial" of virtually anything designed or made in California.  Moore produced California Design shows for the museum in 1962, 1965, 1968, and 1971 and related exhibitions in 1974 (California Design 1910) and 1976 (California Design ’76) at other venues. She was curator of design of the museum from 1962 to 1974, when the Pasadena Art Museum closed and became the Norton Simon Museum.  In addition to the California Design exhibitions, Moore prepared and edited books and filmstrips on design and organized and mounted a variety of other exhibitions and activities in the crafts, including Islands in the Land, about traditional crafts, and the international symposium Fiber as Medium. She also conceived Craftsman Lifestyle: The Gentle Revolution (1976), written by Olivia Emery, and was the moving force behind a review of contemporary American design titled Design U.S.A. (1972).

From 1978 to 1981 Moore served as crafts coordinator at the National Endowment for the Arts. In this position, she campaigned for greater recognition of crafts on a national scale and worked on initiatives to secure the future of craft in America. In particular, she instituted a grant program that encouraged craft practitioners and artists to work in collaboration with architects, planners, and builders. Moore saw crafts and design as essential components in the lives of everyone and in all her initiatives, she sought to place handmade goods in the greater perspective of society.

Moore was recognized many times over for her tireless promotion of the arts both in California and across the nation. She received the Trailblazer Award of the National Home Fashions League in 1971, the Smith College Medal in 1973, and an honorary doctorate from the California College of Arts & Crafts (now California College of the Arts) in 1979. She was made an Honorary College of Fellows member of the American Craft Council in 1980. The October/November 1981 issue of American Craft noted that "With an unflagging interest, intelligence, and energy, Eudorah Moore has celebrated the American craftsman as designer, artist and vital force." Through her exhibitions and national campaigns, Moore not only helped elevate California crafts and design but also the status of handmade goods in America.

Personal life 
While attending Smith College, she met Anson Churchill Moore of New Rochelle, New York, whom she married shortly after her graduation in 1940. The couple moved to the Los Angeles area after their wedding and lived there, with the exception of a 2-year hiatus in Richmond, Virginia, for the rest of their lives. They settled in Pasadena, where they raised four children.

Quotes
"The social as well as the physical climate of California in the 20th century has presented the ideal breeding ground for the new, and more broadly based wave of humane declaration, which we call the New Craftman's Movement. With remnants of the do-it-yourself need of the frontier spirit still intact, and with the sense of individual worth and identity from that experience still within memory, there was little in subjugation or established pattern to overcome. Self-expression was in many ways the base of the culture."

See also

 List of people from Denver, Colorado
 List of people from Pasadena, California

References

American art curators
American women curators
American designers
1918 births
2013 deaths
People from Pasadena, California
Culture of Pasadena, California
National Endowment for the Arts
Place of birth missing
Place of death missing
20th-century United States government officials
21st-century American people
People associated with the Norton Simon Museum
20th-century American women
21st-century American women